Events from the year 1600 in Sweden

Events

 20 March - Linköping Bloodbath conducted against the Sigismund loyalists. 
 - The immigration of Walloons to Sweden begins.
 The War against Sigismund becomes the Polish–Swedish War (1600–11).

Births

 4 March - Hans Christoff von Königsmarck, soldier (died 1663)

Deaths

 19 May - Gustaf Banér, privy Councillor  (born 1547)

References

External links

 
Years of the 16th century in Sweden
Sweden